The Sheffield Wednesday Academy is the youth system of Sheffield Wednesday Football Club.

The academy runs two sides; the U23 Development squad, and the U18 Academy. Both play in the respective age groups' Professional Development League Division 2 North leagues.

History

League history
 1957–58: Sheffield Intermediate League
 1958–59 to 1997–98: Northern Intermediate League
 1997–98: Premier Youth League
 1998–99 to 2011–12: Premier Academy League
 2012–13 to present: Professional Development League

Honours
 FA Youth Cup: runners-up 1991
 Northern Intermediate League Cup: winners 1982, 1989, 1993
 Professional U23 Development League 2: winners 2016–17

Players

Under-21s

Out on loan

Under-18s

Graduates
The following list includes players who have graduated from Sheffield Wednesday's youth system to make their senior debut for the first team. Players who have represented their national team at senior level are highlighted in bold.

As of the end of the 2021-2022 season.

 Mark Beevers
 Luke Boden
 Leigh Bromby
 Tony Crane
 Cameron Dawson
 Matt Hamshaw
 Steve Haslam
 George Hirst
 Ritchie Humphreys
 Alex Hunt
 Arron Jameson
 Connor Kirby
 Sean McAllister
 Lewis McMahon
 Nathan Modest
 Richard O'Donnell
 Matt Penney
 Kevin Pressman
 Jon Shaw
 Liam Shaw
 Rio Shipston
 Tommy Spurr
 Jack Stobbs
 Chris Stringer
 Drew Talbot
 Joe Wildsmith
 Richard Wood
 Junior Agogo
 Rory McArdle
 Rocky Lekaj
 Ciaran Brennan
 Derek Geary
 Liam Palmer
 Fraser Preston

Academy staff

References

 Sheffield Wednesday Official Website
 Sheffield Wednesday Youth Academy Official Webpage

Academy
Football academies in England
1998 establishments in England